Sharbani Mukherjee (alternate name: Sharbani Mukherji) is an Indian actress working in Hindi and Malayalam language films.

Biography 
She is the daughter of Rono Mukerji and thus part of the Mukherjee-Samarth family. Her paternal uncle is Deb Mukherjee, while her paternal uncles were Joy Mukherjee and Shomu Mukherjee. Her paternal grandfather, Sashadhar Mukherjee, was a filmmaker. His wife Satirani Devi was the sister of Ashok Kumar, Anoop Kumar and Kishore Kumar. Her cousins are actresses Rani Mukerji, Kajol and Tanisha, director Ayan Mukerji and noted MIT algebraic geometer Davesh Maulik. Her brother Samrat Mukerji is also a Bollywood and Bengali actor.

Career 
Sharbani made her debut with the hit film Border. She was featured opposite Samir Soni in the song "Ghar Aaja Sonia", sung by Shazia Mansoor. She has also acted in various ads. By 2008 she shifted her focus into Mollywood, her debut Malayalam film Raakilipattu was released after 7 years of production. She played the lead role in the film Sufi Paranja Katha.

Filmography

See also 

 List of Bollywood Clans: The Mukherjees
 Mukherjee-Samarth family
 Mohnish Behl

References

External links 

 

Year of birth missing (living people)
Indian film actresses
Actresses in Malayalam cinema
Living people
Actresses in Hindi cinema
Actresses in Tamil cinema
21st-century Indian actresses
Actresses in Malayalam television
Actresses in Bhojpuri cinema